The Galleria delle Vittorie (Gallery of the Victory) was built as a commercial mall with an entrance on 301 Via Maqueda in central Palermo, region of Sicily, Italy. The five story structure has deteriorated over the decades, though restoration was attempted.

History
The gallery was designed by Paolo Bonci and inaugurated in 1935. The title was meant to honor the Italian victory in their conquest of Ethiopia. The space evokes the glass-roofed commercial malls such as the Galleria Vittorio Emanuele II in Milan. However, this mall, built during the fascist era has a simple and sober facade with the name of the gallery in the Semplicità font used in this era. The entrance had Futurist frescoes, now very degraded, by Alfonso Amorelli celebrating the Italian victories in Ethiopia. The entrance pavement has interlinked black depictions of fasces. The glass roof is lost.

Note 

Derived from Italian Wikipedia entry

Bibliography 
 

Buildings and structures in Palermo
Italian fascist architecture